Varkash (also Romanized as Varkesh; also known as Barkash, Barkesh, and Varkech) is a village in Rudqat Rural District, Sufian District, Shabestar County, East Azerbaijan Province, Iran. At the 2006 census, its population was 491, in 109 families.

References 

Populated places in Shabestar County